The 2020 Córdoba Open was a men's tennis tournament played on outdoor clay courts. It was the second edition of the Córdoba Open, and part of the ATP Tour 250 series of the 2020 ATP Tour. It took place at the Estadio Mario Alberto Kempes in Córdoba, Argentina, from 3 February until 9 February 2020. Third-seeded Cristian Garín won the singles title.

Singles main-draw entrants

Seeds

1 Rankings are as of January 20, 2020

Other entrants
The following players received wildcards into the singles main draw:
  Pedro Cachín
  Francisco Cerúndolo
  Cristian Garín

The following players received entry from the qualifying draw:
  Facundo Bagnis
  Juan Pablo Ficovich
  Pedro Martínez
  Carlos Taberner

The following players received entry as lucky losers:
  Federico Gaio
  Filip Horanský

Withdrawals
Before the tournament
  Roberto Carballés Baena → replaced by  Federico Gaio
  Francisco Cerúndolo → replaced by  Filip Horanský
  Nicolás Jarry → replaced by  Federico Coria
  Casper Ruud → replaced by  Attila Balázs

Doubles main-draw entrants

Seeds

1 Rankings are as of January 20, 2020

Other entrants
The following pairs received wildcards into the doubles main draw:
  Pedro Cachín /  Juan Pablo Ficovich
  Andrea Collarini /  Facundo Mena

The following pairs received entry as alternates:
  Federico Gaio /  Pedro Martínez
  Alessandro Giannessi /  Gianluca Mager

Withdrawals
Before the tournament
  Roberto Carballés Baena
  Gianluca Mager
  Facundo Mena

During the tournament
  Guido Pella
  Albert Ramos Viñolas

Champions

Singles 

  Cristian Garín def.  Diego Schwartzman, 2–6, 6–4, 6–0

Doubles 

  Marcelo Demoliner /  Matwé Middelkoop def.  Leonardo Mayer /  Andrés Molteni, 6–3, 7–6(7–4)

References

External links 
Official website

2020
2020 ATP Tour
2020 in Argentine tennis
February 2020 sports events in Argentina